The Lawrence Formation, also referred to as Lawrence Shale, is a Late-Carboniferous geologic formation in Kansas.

See also 

 List of fossiliferous stratigraphic units in Kansas
 Paleontology in Kansas

References 

Carboniferous Kansas
Carboniferous southern paleotropical deposits